Lecithocera metacausta is a moth in the family Lecithoceridae. It is found in India (Assam, Himachal Pradesh), Taiwan and Korea.

The wingspan is 13–16 mm. The forewings are yellow-ochreous, suffusedly sprinkled with brown or dark fuscous and with the base of the costa more or less suffused with dark fuscous. The discal stigmata are dark fuscous, sometimes with a transverse mark of dark fuscous suffusion between the second discal and the dorsum. There is a dark fuscous patch along the termen from the apex, more or less narrowed downwards and not reaching the tornus. The hindwings are pale grey or in females sometimes grey.

References

Moths described in 1910
metacausta